The Ivanovo constituency (No.91) is a Russian legislative constituency in Ivanovo Oblast. Until 2007 the constituency covered only the city of Ivanovo and western corner of Ivanovo Oblast, however, since 2016 the constituency covers southern half of Ivanovo as well as southern Ivanovo Oblast.

Members elected

Election results

1993

|-
! colspan=2 style="background-color:#E9E9E9;text-align:left;vertical-align:top;" |Candidate
! style="background-color:#E9E9E9;text-align:left;vertical-align:top;" |Party
! style="background-color:#E9E9E9;text-align:right;" |Votes
! style="background-color:#E9E9E9;text-align:right;" |%
|-
|style="background-color:#0085BE"|
|align=left|Viktor Zelyonkin
|align=left|Choice of Russia
|
|31.05%
|-
|style="background-color:"|
|align=left|Andrey Melnikov
|align=left|Independent
|
|13.36%
|-
|style="background-color:"|
|align=left|Vladimir Podzhivotov
|align=left|Independent
|
|12.69%
|-
|style="background-color:#019CDC"|
|align=left|Sergey Zimin
|align=left|Party of Russian Unity and Accord
|
|7.55%
|-
|style="background-color:#E9E26E"|
|align=left|Valery Fedotov
|align=left|Russian Democratic Reform Movement
|
|4.95%
|-
|style="background-color:#000000"|
|colspan=2 |against all
|
|21.98%
|-
| colspan="5" style="background-color:#E9E9E9;"|
|- style="font-weight:bold"
| colspan="3" style="text-align:left;" | Total
| 
| 100%
|-
| colspan="5" style="background-color:#E9E9E9;"|
|- style="font-weight:bold"
| colspan="4" |Source:
|
|}

1995

|-
! colspan=2 style="background-color:#E9E9E9;text-align:left;vertical-align:top;" |Candidate
! style="background-color:#E9E9E9;text-align:left;vertical-align:top;" |Party
! style="background-color:#E9E9E9;text-align:right;" |Votes
! style="background-color:#E9E9E9;text-align:right;" |%
|-
|style="background-color:"|
|align=left|Vladimir Laritsky
|align=left|Independent
|
|20.11%
|-
|style="background-color:"|
|align=left|Valentin Bakulin
|align=left|Communist Party
|
|12.94%
|-
|style="background-color:"|
|align=left|Pavel Shapovalov
|align=left|Liberal Democratic Party
|
|10.41%
|-
|style="background-color:"|
|align=left|Valery Troyeglazov
|align=left|Independent
|
|8.86%
|-
|style="background-color:"|
|align=left|Sergey Zimin
|align=left|Our Home – Russia
|
|8.65%
|-
|style="background-color:#3A46CE"|
|align=left|Viktor Zelyonkin (incumbent)
|align=left|Democratic Choice of Russia – United Democrats
|
|8.45%
|-
|style="background-color:"|
|align=left|Boris Bolshakov
|align=left|Independent
|
|4.78%
|-
|style="background-color:"|
|align=left|Aleksandr Budanov
|align=left|Yabloko
|
|3.95%
|-
|style="background-color:#EE2D2A"|
|align=left|Galina Dushina
|align=left|Block of Djuna
|
|2.89%
|-
|style="background-color:#2C299A"|
|align=left|Sergey Repyakhov
|align=left|Congress of Russian Communities
|
|2.19%
|-
|style="background-color:"|
|align=left|Sergey Padylin
|align=left|Independent
|
|2.12%
|-
|style="background-color:"|
|align=left|Aleksandr Zorkin
|align=left|Independent
|
|1.42%
|-
|style="background-color:#CE1100"|
|align=left|Feliks Sanakoyev
|align=left|My Fatherland
|
|0.64%
|-
|style="background-color:#DA2021"|
|align=left|Vladimir Kotin
|align=left|Ivan Rybkin Bloc
|
|0.50%
|-
|style="background-color:"|
|align=left|Igor Dementyev
|align=left|Independent
|
|0.35%
|-
|style="background-color:#000000"|
|colspan=2 |against all
|
|9.67%
|-
| colspan="5" style="background-color:#E9E9E9;"|
|- style="font-weight:bold"
| colspan="3" style="text-align:left;" | Total
| 
| 100%
|-
| colspan="5" style="background-color:#E9E9E9;"|
|- style="font-weight:bold"
| colspan="4" |Source:
|
|}

1999

|-
! colspan=2 style="background-color:#E9E9E9;text-align:left;vertical-align:top;" |Candidate
! style="background-color:#E9E9E9;text-align:left;vertical-align:top;" |Party
! style="background-color:#E9E9E9;text-align:right;" |Votes
! style="background-color:#E9E9E9;text-align:right;" |%
|-
|style="background-color:"|
|align=left|Tatyana Yakovleva
|align=left|Unity
|
|20.91%
|-
|style="background-color:"|
|align=left|Ivan Pimenov
|align=left|Independent
|
|14.38%
|-
|style="background-color:"|
|align=left|Vasily Duma
|align=left|Independent
|
|9.49%
|-
|style="background-color:"|
|align=left|Valery Bobylev
|align=left|Independent
|
|7.90%
|-
|style="background-color:"|
|align=left|Sergey Sirotkin
|align=left|Liberal Democratic Party
|
|5.91%
|-
|style="background-color:#3B9EDF"|
|align=left|Pavel Pozhigaylo
|align=left|Fatherland – All Russia
|
|5.50%
|-
|style="background-color:"|
|align=left|Andrey Serov
|align=left|Independent
|
|4.26%
|-
|style="background-color:"|
|align=left|Andrey Kabelev
|align=left|Independent
|
|3.94%
|-
|style="background-color:"|
|align=left|Sergey Repyakhov
|align=left|Independent
|
|3.30%
|-
|style="background:"| 
|align=left|Nikolay Filin
|align=left|Yabloko
|
|2.68%
|-
|style="background-color:"|
|align=left|Boris Mints
|align=left|Independent
|
|2.48%
|-
|style="background-color:"|
|align=left|Vyacheslav Kulikov
|align=left|Independent
|
|1.87%
|-
|style="background-color:"|
|align=left|Yury Chayka
|align=left|Russian All-People's Union
|
|1.39%
|-
|style="background-color:#FF4400"|
|align=left|Aleksandr Mirskoy
|align=left|Andrey Nikolayev and Svyatoslav Fyodorov Bloc
|
|1.09%
|-
|style="background-color:"|
|align=left|Valentina Gubernatorova
|align=left|Kedr
|
|1.07%
|-
|style="background-color:"|
|align=left|Sergey Zimin
|align=left|Our Home – Russia
|
|0.83%
|-
|style="background-color:#084284"|
|align=left|Aleksandr Balashov
|align=left|Spiritual Heritage
|
|0.46%
|-
|style="background-color:"|
|align=left|Sergey Grigoryev
|align=left|Independent
|
|0.28%
|-
|style="background-color:#020266"|
|align=left|Vladimir Kotin
|align=left|Russian Socialist Party
|
|0.21%
|-
|style="background-color:#000000"|
|colspan=2 |against all
|
|10.37%
|-
| colspan="5" style="background-color:#E9E9E9;"|
|- style="font-weight:bold"
| colspan="3" style="text-align:left;" | Total
| 
| 100%
|-
| colspan="5" style="background-color:#E9E9E9;"|
|- style="font-weight:bold"
| colspan="4" |Source:
|
|}

2003

|-
! colspan=2 style="background-color:#E9E9E9;text-align:left;vertical-align:top;" |Candidate
! style="background-color:#E9E9E9;text-align:left;vertical-align:top;" |Party
! style="background-color:#E9E9E9;text-align:right;" |Votes
! style="background-color:#E9E9E9;text-align:right;" |%
|-
|style="background-color:"|
|align=left|Tatyana Yakovleva (incumbent)
|align=left|United Russia
|
|30.46%
|-
|style="background-color:"|
|align=left|Galina Kuzmina
|align=left|Communist Party
|
|10.73%
|-
|style="background-color:#1042A5"|
|align=left|Sergey Kolesov
|align=left|Union of Right Forces
|
|10.63%
|-
|style="background-color:#00A1FF"|
|align=left|Valery Troyeglazov
|align=left|Party of Russia's Rebirth-Russian Party of Life
|
|10.21%
|-
|style="background-color:"|
|align=left|Sergey Sirotkin
|align=left|Liberal Democratic Party
|
|9.47%
|-
|style="background-color:"|
|align=left|Viktor Pavlov
|align=left|Independent
|
|4.61%
|-
|style="background-color:"|
|align=left|Vladimir Cherkashov
|align=left|Independent
|
|3.84%
|-
|style="background-color:"|
|align=left|Nasib Kurbanov
|align=left|Agrarian Party
|
|2.36%
|-
|style="background-color:#7C73CC"|
|align=left|Leonid Belyayev
|align=left|Great Russia – Eurasian Union
|
|1.00%
|-
|style="background-color:#000000"|
|colspan=2 |against all
|
|15.27%
|-
| colspan="5" style="background-color:#E9E9E9;"|
|- style="font-weight:bold"
| colspan="3" style="text-align:left;" | Total
| 
| 100%
|-
| colspan="5" style="background-color:#E9E9E9;"|
|- style="font-weight:bold"
| colspan="4" |Source:
|
|}

2016

|-
! colspan=2 style="background-color:#E9E9E9;text-align:left;vertical-align:top;" |Candidate
! style="background-color:#E9E9E9;text-align:leftt;vertical-align:top;" |Party
! style="background-color:#E9E9E9;text-align:right;" |Votes
! style="background-color:#E9E9E9;text-align:right;" |%
|-
| style="background-color: " |
|align=left|Aleksey Khokhlov
|align=left|United Russia
|
|41.06%
|-
|style="background-color:"|
|align=left|Dmitry Salomatin
|align=left|Communist Party
|
|17.42%
|-
|style="background-color:"|
|align=left|Dmitry Shelyakin
|align=left|Liberal Democratic Party
|
|14.35%
|-
|style="background-color:"|
|align=left|Pavel Popov
|align=left|A Just Russia
|
|7.75%
|-
|style="background:"| 
|align=left|Aleksandr Orekhov
|align=left|Communists of Russia
|
|4.32%
|-
|style="background-color:"|
|align=left|Olga Daricheva
|align=left|The Greens
|
|3.84%
|-
|style="background-color:"|
|align=left|Danila Belyayev
|align=left|Yabloko
|
|2.87%
|-
|style="background-color:"|
|align=left|Vyacheslav Kalinin
|align=left|Rodina
|
|2.18%
|-
|style="background-color:"|
|align=left|Vladimir Kurin
|align=left|Patriots of Russia
|
|1.57%
|-
|style="background-color:"|
|align=left|Roman Astafyev
|align=left|Civic Platform
|
|1.47%
|-
| colspan="5" style="background-color:#E9E9E9;"|
|- style="font-weight:bold"
| colspan="3" style="text-align:left;" | Total
| 
| 100%
|-
| colspan="5" style="background-color:#E9E9E9;"|
|- style="font-weight:bold"
| colspan="4" |Source:
|
|}

2021

|-
! colspan=2 style="background-color:#E9E9E9;text-align:left;vertical-align:top;" |Candidate
! style="background-color:#E9E9E9;text-align:left;vertical-align:top;" |Party
! style="background-color:#E9E9E9;text-align:right;" |Votes
! style="background-color:#E9E9E9;text-align:right;" |%
|-
|style="background-color: " |
|align=left|Viktor Smirnov
|align=left|United Russia
|
|38.96%
|-
|style="background-color:"|
|align=left|Svetlana Protasevich
|align=left|Communist Party
|
|23.10%
|-
|style="background-color:"|
|align=left|Sergey Klyuyev
|align=left|Liberal Democratic Party
|
|8.71%
|-
|style="background-color:"|
|align=left|Sergey Shestukhin
|align=left|A Just Russia — For Truth
|
|8.63%
|-
|style="background-color: "|
|align=left|Valery Boyarkov
|align=left|Party of Pensioners
|
|5.46%
|-
|style="background-color: "|
|align=left|Sharaf Ibragimov
|align=left|New People
|
|3.36%
|-
|style="background:"| 
|align=left|Rushan Taktarov
|align=left|Communists of Russia
|
|2.27%
|-
|style="background-color:"|
|align=left|Aleksey Ananyev
|align=left|Rodina
|
|2.14%
|-
|style="background-color:"|
|align=left|Andrey Avtoneyev
|align=left|Yabloko
|
|1.87%
|-
|style="background-color:"|
|align=left|Vladimir Khudyakov
|align=left|The Greens
|
|1.69%
|-
| colspan="5" style="background-color:#E9E9E9;"|
|- style="font-weight:bold"
| colspan="3" style="text-align:left;" | Total
| 
| 100%
|-
| colspan="5" style="background-color:#E9E9E9;"|
|- style="font-weight:bold"
| colspan="4" |Source:
|
|}

Notes

References

Russian legislative constituencies
Politics of Ivanovo Oblast